Kia Abdullah (born 17 May 1982) is a British novelist and travel writer. She is the best-selling author of courtroom dramas Take It Back (HarperCollins, 2019), Truth Be Told (HarperCollins, 2020) and Next of Kin (HarperCollins, 2021), and has written for The New York Times, The Guardian, The Times, The Financial Times, The Telegraph  and the BBC, among other publications.

Background
Abdullah is of Bangladeshi descent and was born and brought up in the London borough of Tower Hamlets in a family of eight children. Of her childhood, Abdullah has said: "[People] imagine poverty and misery, hardship and hand-me-downs. Of course I forfeited my fair share of material pleasures but a household of noise and colour is far better than possessions and privilege."

Education 
Abdullah was educated in England. She graduated from Queen Mary, University of London with a first class in BSc Computer Science. Her final year thesis was titled A Program Slicing Tool for Analysing Java Programs. Abdullah has an IQ of 150. She was a member of Mensa International – a non-profit organization open to people who score at the 98th percentile of IQ – but left within a year of joining.

Career

Abdullah graduated in 2003, after which she worked in tech for three years. In 2007, she quit her job in tech to pursue a career as a writer, taking a 50% pay cut in the process.

From 2008 to 2010, Abdullah wrote about a range of topics, from politics to relationships, for The Guardian. She also worked as Features Editor at Asian Woman magazine, during which time she interviewed a range of prominent Asian actors and musicians including Riz Ahmed, Meera Syal, Nitin Sawhney, Jay Sean and Anoushka Shankar. During this time she also published two novels, 2006's Life, Love and Assimilation and 2009's Child's Play.

Abdullah was an occasional guest on BBC Radio 2's Jeremy Vine Show as well as BBC Asian Network's DJ Nihal show and spoke publicly about a range of subjects, from drug abuse and gender inequality to dealing with culture and identity as a British-Asian writer. In 2009, she was nominated for a Muslim Writers Award. In 2011, she was involved in a Twitter controversy.

In 2012, Abdullah joined global publisher Penguin Random House where she worked on travel brand Rough Guides. In 2014, Abdullah quit her job to found Atlas & Boots, an outdoor travel blog read by 150,000 people a month. Abdullah has contributed to Lonely Planet and Rough Guides and has spoken about her travels on television, radio, print and online. She and photographer Peter Watson released the travel book Don't Offer Papaya: 101 Tips for Your First Time Around the World in 2014.

In 2019, Abdullah's mainstream debut crime novel, Take It Back, was published by HarperCollins. It was chosen by The Guardian, The Telegraph and The Sunday Times newspapers as one of the best new crime and thriller novels.

In 2020, Abdullah's fourth novel, Truth Be Told, was published by HarperCollins and consequently short-listed for a Diverse Book Award. In July that year, Abdullah founded Asian Booklist, a website to help readers discover new books by British-Asian authors.

In 2021, Abdullah's fifth novel, Next of Kin, was published by HarperCollins. It was named The Times Book of the Month, was long-listed for the CWA Gold Dagger and won the Diverse Book Award for Adult Fiction.

Her sixth novel, Those People Next Door, is due to be published in 2023.

Personal life 
Abdullah is in a relationship with British travel photographer Peter Watson. Abdullah was born and brought up as Muslim. In 2020, she stated that she identifies as an agnostic and a cultural Muslim.

Abdullah speaks three languages: English, Bengali and Spanish.

Bibliography
Novels

 2006: Life, Love and Assimilation
 2009: Child's Play
 2019: Take It Back
 2020: Truth Be Told
 2021: Next of Kin
 2023: Those People Next Door

Nonfiction

 2014: Don't Offer Papaya: 101 Tips for Your First Time Around the World (with Peter Watson)

References

External links

1982 births
Living people
People from the London Borough of Tower Hamlets
People educated at Central Foundation Girls' School
21st-century English novelists
21st-century English women writers
Alumni of Queen Mary University of London
British Asian writers
English agnostics
English people of Bangladeshi descent
English women novelists
English journalists
English columnists
Mensans
The Guardian journalists
British women columnists
Writers from London
English women non-fiction writers
Cultural Muslims